The 1996 Halloween Havoc  was the eighth annual Halloween Havoc professional wrestling pay-per-view (PPV) event produced by World Championship Wrestling (WCW). It took place on October 27, 1996, from the MGM Grand Garden Arena in the Las Vegas suburb of Paradise, Nevada.

The event was notable for the first appearance of former World Wrestling Federation (WWF, now WWE) wrestler "Rowdy" Roddy Piper in WCW, who had left the WWF the previous month after he had signed with the company.

In 2014, all of WCW's Halloween Havoc PPVs became available on WWE's streaming service, the WWE Network.

Production

Background
Halloween Havoc was an annual professional wrestling pay-per-view event produced by World Championship Wrestling (WCW) since 1989. As the name implies, it was a Halloween-themed show held in October. The 1996 event was the eighth event in the Halloween Havoc chronology and it took place on October 27, 1996, from the MGM Grand Garden Arena in the Las Vegas suburb of Paradise, Nevada.

Storylines
The event featured professional wrestling matches that involve different wrestlers from pre-existing scripted feuds and storylines. Professional wrestlers portray villains, heroes, or less distinguishable characters in the scripted events that build tension and culminate in a wrestling match or series of matches.

Event

Prior to the start of the pay-per-view there were two dark matches.  The first match saw Jim Powers defeated Pat Tanaka and the second match saw Psychosis and Juventud Guerrera defeated Damián and Halloween.

The opening match of the pay-per-view was for the WCW Cruiserweight Championship. This match saw Dean Malenko defeat Rey Misterio Jr. to capture the championship. Prior to the event, Malenko had stolen Misterio’s mask.  During the match, Misterio got his original mask back and switched masks. Malenko however was able to hit a gutwrench powerbomb off the top tope for the victory.

The second match saw Diamond Dallas Page defeat Eddie Guerrero via pinfall after hitting the Diamond Cutter.

In the next match, The Giant faced Jeff Jarrett. The Giant came to the ring for the match with the WCW United States Champion, which he had despite never actually winning it. The Giant ultimately won the match by disqualification. As The Giant attempted to chokeslam Jarrett on the floor, Ric Flair hit The Giant with a low blow, forcing the referee to disqualify Jarrett.

The next match saw Syxx defeat Chris Jericho. When Jericho was arguing with referee Nick Patrick about slow counts, Syxx used the opportunity to hit Jericho with a spin kick, and picked up the pinfall victory.

Next Lex Luger defeated Arn Anderson via submission. After Luger hit Anderson in the back with a chair, Luger was able to apply the Torture Rack, to which Anderson submitted. Prior to the next match, it was mentioned that Flair had accompanied Anderson to the local hospital.

In the following match Steve McMichael and Chris Benoit defeated The Faces of Fear (Meng and The Barbarian). After McMichael attacked Meng, Benoit hit the headbutt off the top rope for the pinfall victory.

The second to last match saw The Outsiders (Kevin Nash and Scott Hall) win the WCW World Tag Team Championship by defeating Harlem Heat (Booker T and Stevie Ray). Toward the end of the match, Nash grabbed the cane of Col. Robert Parker, who had accompanied Harlem Heat to the ring, and broke it over the head of Booker T. This gave Hall the opportunity to cover Booker T and pick up the victory and the titles.

The main event saw Hollywood Hogan defeating Randy Savage to retain the WCW World Heavyweight Championship. The Giant chokeslammed Savage to the floor; Giant then dragged an unconscious Hogan onto Savage. During the match, Miss Elizabeth came down to ringside and wasn't sure whose corner to go to. Roddy Piper came out following the match to confront Hogan and make his WCW debut.

Results

References

Holidays themed professional wrestling events
Professional wrestling shows in the Las Vegas Valley
Events in Paradise, Nevada
1996 in Nevada
Halloween Havoc
October 1996 events in the United States
1996 World Championship Wrestling pay-per-view events